Little Deer Isle is an island in Penobscot Bay, lying just north of the town (and island) of Deer Isle, of which it is a part. The island is served by Maine State Route 15 via the Deer Isle Bridge. The north end of the island is called Eggemoggin and there is a small island with a lighthouse on it at the tip called Pumpkin Island. There are only about 300 year-round residents of Little Deer, but many more summer residents. There is abundant wildlife on the island including deer, fox, squirrels, wild turkeys, ospreys, and bald eagles.

See also
 List of islands of Maine

Islands of Hancock County, Maine
Islands of Maine
Coastal islands of Maine